Muhammad Niaz is a retired heavyweight freestyle wrestler from Pakistan.

Career
At the 1962 British Empire and Commonwealth Games in Perth, Niaz won the gold medal alongside another wrestler with the same name Muhammad Niaz-Din. He also participated at the 1962 Asian Games in Jakarta, Indonesia in both freestyle and Greco-Roman styles. He won the Greco-Roman competition but finished third in freestyle.

References

UWW Profile

Pakistani male sport wrestlers
Commonwealth Games gold medallists for Pakistan
Commonwealth Games medallists in wrestling
Wrestlers at the 1962 Asian Games
Asian Games gold medalists for Pakistan
Asian Games bronze medalists for Pakistan
Medalists at the 1962 Asian Games
Asian Games medalists in wrestling
Wrestlers at the 1962 British Empire and Commonwealth Games
Possibly living people
Year of birth missing
20th-century Pakistani people
Medallists at the 1962 British Empire and Commonwealth Games